Bed of roses is an English expression which means an easy and peaceful life.

Bed of Roses may also refer to:

Film and TV
 Bed of Roses (1933 film), a 1933 comedy film that featured Constance Bennett and Pert Kelton
 Bed of Roses (1996 film), a 1996 romance film that starred Mary Stuart Masterson and Christian Slater
 Bed of Roses (TV series), a 2008 Australian drama/comedy television series

Music
 "Bed of Roses" (Bon Jovi song), 1993
 "Bed of Roses" (Screaming Trees song), 1991
 "Bed of Rose's", a 1971 song by The Statler Brothers
 "Bed of Roses", a song by Bette Midler from Bette of Roses
 "En säng av rosor", a song by Darin

Other uses
Bed O' Roses, a racehorse
 Bed of Roses (novel), a novel by Nora Roberts